George Arthur Temple (1887 – unknown) was an English footballer who played for Hull City in the Football League.

References

1887 births
Footballers from Newcastle upon Tyne
English footballers
Association football forwards
Hull City A.F.C. players
Blyth Spartans A.F.C. players
English Football League players
Year of death missing